The 11th Central Committee was elected at the 11th National Congress of the Lao People's Revolutionary Party on 15 January 2021, and is composed of 71 ordinary members and ten substitutes. As an institution, the Central Committee is the party's highest decision-making body between convocations of the National Congress, which convenes every fifth year. Since the LPRP has a monopoly on state power in Laos, the Central Committees formulates policies which the state implements. In between plenary sessions of the 11th Central Committee the 11th Politburo, is the party's highest decision-making body.

The numbers of members increased from 69 ordinary 8 substitutes in the 10th Central Committee to 71 ordinary and substitutes in the 11th. Of the 71 ordinary members, twelve are women. This is an increase from six in the 10th. Military representation increased by one spot, from seven (10th) to eighth (11th). Additionally, 36 members are aged 60 and over, that is 50,70% of members. The remaining 40,30%, the remaining 35 members, are aged 46 to 59 years. 19 members, accounting for 26,76%, who joined the LPRP during the Lao revolution. Education wise the majority of members have passed a test in Marxist–Leninist theory. Of the 71 members, 28 have a PhD (39,43%) and 27 who have a master's Degree (38,02%).

Many members of the 11th Central Committee were related by blood to former LPRP leaders.  Four members were the children of former LPRP Chairman Khamtai Siphandon (Sonexay, Viengthong, Viengsavath and Athsaphangthong) and another three were the children of former LPRP General Secretary Kaysone Phomvihane (Saysomphone, Santiphap and Thongsavanh). Of these, two of the term serve in the 11th Politburo (Saysomphone and Sonexay) and on in the 11th Secretariat (Viengthong)." Bounkham Vorachit, the daughter of outgoing LPRP General Secretary Bounnhang Vorachit, was also elected to the 11th. Lao analyst Martin Stuart-Fox opine that "These promotions serve as a reminder of the extent to which powerful families still determine political outcomes in Laos — just as they did during the previous Royal Lao regime." Assistant Professor Simon Creak noted that the 11th Central Committee is the first elected leadership body not dominated by the revolutionary generation. He also considered the possibility of there being a conflict between party leaders who've gained power through family patronage and those who rose through the party ranks by technocratic means. The former espouse more modern values, such as party discipline and socialist state-building Creak contends. However, Creak notes that "Speculation aside, talk of tension between patronage and technocratic socialism would be premature. Revolutionary family patronage networks are unlikely to fade anytime soon. Sonexay may have failed to leapfrog rivals, but the Siphandone family boosted its representation in the Central Committee, as did other influential families."

Keys

Plenums

Apparatus heads

Members

Full

Alternates

References

2021 establishments in Laos
11th Central Committee of the Lao People's Revolutionary Party